= Poplar Grove, Virginia =

Unincorporated community in Virginia, US

Coordinates: 37°35′07″N 77°02′18″W

Poplar Grove is an unincorporated community in New Kent County, Virginia, United States.
